The chain-striped south-west ctenotus (Ctenotus catenifer)  is a species of skink found in Western Australia.

References

catenifer
Reptiles described in 1974
Taxa named by Glen Milton Storr